Jeremy Chinn (born February 26, 1998) is an American football free safety for the Carolina Panthers of the National Football League (NFL). He played college football at Southern Illinois.

Early years
Chinn attended Fishers High School in Fishers, Indiana. He played defensive back and running back for the Tigers football team.

College career
Chinn played at Southern Illinois from 2016 to 2019. He played both safety and cornerback. In 2016, Chinn was named to the Missouri Valley Football Conference All-Newcomer Team, and the FCS Freshman All-American first-team. In 2017, he was named to the All-MVFC second-team. In 2018 and 2019, he was named to the All-MVFC first-team. Chinn was also named a consensus FCS All-American in 2019. During his career, he started 27 of 38 games, recording 243 tackles, 13 interceptions, and one sack.

Professional career

Chinn was selected in the second round with the 64th overall pick in the 2020 NFL Draft by the Carolina Panthers.

In Week 6 against the Chicago Bears, Chinn recorded his first career interception off a pass thrown by Nick Foles during the 23–16 loss. He was named Defensive Rookie of the Month after posting 30 tackles, four passes defensed, and an interception in the month of October. In Week 12 against the Minnesota Vikings, Chinn recovered a fumble lost by quarterback Kirk Cousins and returned it for a 17-yard touchdown. On the next play of the game, Chinn forced a fumble on running back Dalvin Cook, recovered the football, and returned it for a 28-yard touchdown. Chinn finished the game with a team high 13 tackles as the Panthers would go on to lose 27–28.
Chinn was named the Defensive Rookie of the Month for his performance in November.

On October 5, 2022, Chinn was placed on injured reserve after suffering a hamstring injury in Week 4. He was activated on November 19.

NFL career statistics

Personal life
Chinn is the nephew of former Denver Broncos Hall of Famer Steve Atwater.

References

External links
Carolina Panthers bio
Southern Illinois Salukis bio

1998 births
Living people
People from Fishers, Indiana
Players of American football from Indiana
American football linebackers
American football safeties
Southern Illinois Salukis football players
Carolina Panthers players
Ed Block Courage Award recipients